Sidney Webb (February 1884 – 1956) was an English professional footballer who played in the Football League for Birmingham. He played as an inside forward.

Webb was born in Coventry. He gained a good reputation playing in the Birmingham & District League for Stourbridge, Burton United and Wednesbury Old Athletic, and spent a season with Aston Villa, though never progressed beyond the reserves. In April 1911 Webb, described as a "rotund little schemer", joined Second Division club Birmingham. He made his debut on the opening day of the 1911–12 season, in a 3–2 home defeat against Bradford Park Avenue, and kept his place for the next two games, but that was the extent of his career in the Football League. Webb then returned to the Birmingham League with Worcester City, where he scored 12 goals in the next two seasons.

Webb died in Leamington, Warwickshire, in 1956.

References

1884 births
1956 deaths
Footballers from Coventry
English footballers
Association football forwards
Stourbridge F.C. players
Aston Villa F.C. players
Burton United F.C. players
Birmingham City F.C. players
Worcester City F.C. players
English Football League players
Date of death missing
Wednesbury Old Athletic F.C. players